Neeli Zinda Hai is a Pakistani supernatural horror drama series, directed by Qasim Ali Mureed, and written by Adeel Razzaq. It features Urwa Hocane, Mohib Mirza and Sonia Mishal in lead roles. It premiered on ARY Digital on 20 May 2021.

Plot 
The story revolves around a married couple, Aman and Sumbul who are trying to make up lost time and love. Life keeps becoming difficult for Sumbul after a stillborn birth, an empty marriage, black magic by a broken mother-in-law, and a mute daughter named Minaal. After moving into a new house the family starts to experience certain paranormal activities. Sumbul hires a maid for housework and even the maid experiences the paranormal happenings. Aman refuses to believe in supernatural forces which leaves Sumbul into dealing with her issues on her own. The broken family tries to get closer to each other but grow further apart due to Neeli and her actions.

Cast 

 Urwa Hocane as Neeli Pervaiz [Spirit]
 Sonia Mishal as Sumbul Aman Faheem
 Mohib Mirza as Aman Faheem
 Osama Tahir as Pervaiz
 Kinza Malik as Meharbano Faheem
 Tahir Jatoi as Dilawar
 Jinaan Hussain as Nagina Servant 
 Aliya Ali as Aliya Faheem sister of Aman
 Tahreem Ali Hameed as Minaal/Manu Aman
 Mohammad Ahmed as Faheem
 Hina Rizvi as Shaista Nawab 
 Agha Mustafa Hassan as Nawab
 Shamim Hilaly as Pervaiz's mother
 Saba Faisal as Neeli's mother
 Rashid Farooqui as Neeli's father
 Imam Syed as Mr Alam friend of Faheem

References

External links 
 

Pakistani drama television series
2021 Pakistani television series debuts
Urdu-language television shows
ARY Digital original programming
ARY Digital
Pakistani horror fiction television series